Demeter Hunyadi (1579–1592) was a Hungarian Unitarian. In 1579 he became the second superintendent of the Antitrinitarian Church.

References

Hungarian Unitarians
1592 deaths
1579 births